The featherweight class in the boxing at the 1964 Summer Olympics competition was the third-lightest class.  Featherweights were limited to those boxers weighing less than 57 kilograms. The competition was held from October 13, 1964 to October 23, 1964. 32 boxers from 32 nations competed.

Medallists

Results

Spanish boxer Valentín Loren punched a Hungarian referee in the face after being disqualified; he was banned for life from international competition.

References

Sources

Featherweight